In enzymology, an arylamine glucosyltransferase is an enzyme that catalyzes the chemical reaction

UDP-glucose + an arylamine  UDP + an N-D-glucosylarylamine

Thus, the two substrates of this enzyme are UDP-glucose and arylamine, whereas its two products are UDP and N-D-glucosylarylamine.

This enzyme belongs to the family of glycosyltransferases, specifically the hexosyltransferases.  The systematic name of this enzyme class is UDP-glucose:arylamine N-D-glucosyltransferase. Other names in common use include UDP glucose-arylamine glucosyltransferase, and uridine diphosphoglucose-arylamine glucosyltransferase.

References

 

EC 2.4.1
Enzymes of unknown structure